Səməd Vurğun is a village and municipality in the Shamkir Rayon of Azerbaijan. It has a population of 1,433.  The village was named after Soviet writer Samad Vurgun.

References

Populated places in Shamkir District